Gangadhar Meher University, Amruta Vihar, formerly Sambalpur College and Gangadhar Meher College, is a state university situated in Sambalpur, Odisha, India. It is named after the Odia poet, Gangadhar Meher. N Nagaraju is the current vice-chancellor, while Smt. Jugaleswari Dash is the registrar and Uma Charan Pati is the deputy registrar.

History
The university  was established as college in 1944 as Sambalpur College with 192 students. The name of the institution was changed to Gangadhar Meher College in 1949. It was upgraded to a university in 2015, and has been renamed as Gangadhar Meher University.

References

Universities and colleges in Sambalpur
Universities in Odisha
Educational institutions established in 1944
1944 establishments in India
Colleges affiliated to Sambalpur University